V.I.P. (Very Interesting People) is a Canadian talk show that aired from 1973 to 1983, generally during the Canadian summer months. Lorraine Thomson was host/interviewer.

Guests included:
 Group of Seven artist A. J. Casson 
 actress Nanette Fabray 
 actor John Forsythe 
 musician André Gagnon 
 actor Lorne Greene 
 British Prime Minister Edward Heath
 astronaut James Irwin 
 actor George "Spanky" McFarland of Our Gang 
 British actress Anna Russell 
 hockey player Darryl Sittler

Episodes from this series were rebroadcast on Canadian cable network Bravo from 1998 to 2002.

External links 

 Queen's University Directory of CBC Television Series (VIP archived listing link via archive.org)

CBC Television original programming
1973 Canadian television series debuts
1983 Canadian television series endings
1970s Canadian television talk shows
1980s Canadian television talk shows